Heller's broad-nosed bat (Platyrrhinus helleri) is a bat species from South and Central America.

References

Platyrrhinus
Bats of South America
Bats of Brazil
Mammals of Colombia
Mammals described in 1866
Taxa named by Wilhelm Peters
Bats of Central America